Chrome Remote Desktop is a remote desktop software tool, developed by Google, that allows a user to remotely control another computer's desktop through a proprietary protocol also developed by Google, internally called Chromoting. The protocol transmits the keyboard and mouse events from the client to the server, relaying the graphical screen updates back in the other direction over a computer network. This feature therefore consists of a server component for the host computer, and a client component on the computer accessing the remote server. Note that Chrome Remote Desktop uses a unique protocol, as opposed to using the common Remote Desktop Protocol (developed by Microsoft).

Software 

The Chrome Remote Desktop client was originally a Chrome extension from the Chrome Web Store requiring Google Chrome; the extension is deprecated, and a web portal is available at remotedesktop.google.com. The browser must support WebRTC and other unspecified "modern web platform features". The client software is also available on Android and iOS.

If the computer hosts remote access, such as for remote support and system administration, a server package is downloaded. A Chromium-based browser that supports Chromium extensions such as Google Chrome or Microsoft Edge must be used. This is available for Microsoft Windows, OS X, Linux and ChromeOS.

The Chrome Remote Desktop allows a permanent, pre-authorized connection to a remote computer, designed to allow a user to connect to another one of their own machines remotely. In contrast, Remote Assistance is designed for short-lived remote connections, and requires an operator on the remote computer to participate in authentication, as remote assistance login is via PIN passwords generated by the remote host's human operator.  This method of connection will also periodically block out the control from the connecting user, requiring the person on the host machine to click a button to "Continue sharing" with the connected client.

The protocol uses VP8 video encoding to display the remote computer's desktop to the user with high performance over low bandwidth connections. Under Windows, it supports copying and pasting across the two devices and real-time audio feed as well, but lacks an option to disable sharing and transmission of the audio stream. The software is limited to 100 clients. Attempting to add further PCs after reaching 100 will result in a "failed to register computer" error.

See also 
 Comparison of remote desktop software
 Remote Desktop Protocol
 Chromebook (ChromeOS)

References

External links
 

Remote desktop
Remote desktop software for Linux
Google Chrome extensions
Google software